DeWeese is a surname. Notable people with the surname include:

Bill DeWeese (born 1950), American politician
Bob DeWeese (politician) (1934-2020), American politician
Bob DeWeese (basketball) (1915–1991), American basketball player
Devin Deweese (1835–1906), American historian
Ebby DeWeese (1904–1942), American football player
Gene DeWeese (1934–2012), American writer
Gennie DeWeese (1921–2007), American painter
John T. Deweese (1835–1906), American politician
Mary Ann DeWeese (1913–1993), American designer

See also
Deweese, Nebraska
DeWeese Reservoir